Addison Township is a civil township of northeast Oakland County in the U.S. state of Michigan.  As of the 2020 census, the township population was 6,256.

The Township was named for pioneer settler Addison Chamberlain.

Communities 
 The village of Leonard is in the northeast part of the township. The Leonard ZIP code 48367 serves most of the eastern portion of the township.
The Township has two unincorporated communities:
Campbells Corner is on the southern border with Oakland Charter Township.
It was founded and named by Sherman Hopkins in 1830. It was the first white settlement in the Township, which had been named for pioneer settler Addison Chamberlain. A post office was established in November 1836, and Lakeville was platted in 1840. The community is served by the P.O. box-only ZIP code 48366.

Geography

Demographics
As of the census of 2000, there were 6,439 people, 2,174 households, and 1,752 families residing in the township. The racial makeup of the township was 97.10% White, 1.07% African American, 0.33% Native American, 0.23% Asian, 0.02% Pacific Islander, 0.26% from other races, and 0.99% from two or more races. Hispanic or Latino of any race were 1.94% of the population.

There were 2,174 households, out of which 39.9% had children under the age of 18 living with them, 70.4% were married couples living together, 6.1% had a female householder with no husband present, and 19.4% were non-families. 14.5% of all households were made up of individuals, and 3.5% had someone living alone who was 65 years of age or older.  The average household size was 2.89 and the average family size was 3.21.

In the township the population was spread out, with 29.2% under the age of 18, 6.6% from 18 to 24, 30.1% from 25 to 44, 27.3% from 45 to 64, and 6.9% who were 65 years of age or older.  The median age was 37 years. For every 100 females, there were 105.6 males.  For every 100 females age 18 and over, there were 102.9 males.

The median income for a household in the township was $69,266, and the median income for a family was $79,019. Males had a median income of $60,281 versus $30,720 for females. The per capita income for the township was $29,350.  About 3.8% of families and 5.7% of the population were below the poverty line, including 6.1% of those under age 18 and 6.3% of those age 65 and over.

Education
Most of Addison Township is in Oxford Community Schools. Other portions are in Lake Orion Community Schools, Almont Community Schools, and Romeo Community Schools. The first district's zoned high school is Oxford High School. The others', respectively, are Lake Orion High School, Almont High School, and Romeo High School.

Notable residents
Mark S. Brewer (1837–1901), United States Congressman

References

External links

Addison Township

Metro Detroit
Townships in Oakland County, Michigan
Townships in Michigan